The Santuario de Nuestra Señora de la Soledad is a church in Tlaquepaque, in the Mexican state of Jalisco.

References

External links

 

Churches in Mexico
Tlaquepaque